Cortes de Pallás is a municipality in the comarca of Valle de Cofrentes in the Valencian Community, Spain.

References

External links
 

Municipalities in the Province of Valencia
Valle de Cofrentes